Zanthoxylum albuquerquei is a species of tree in the family Rutaceae. It is endemic to Peru.

Description
Trees up to 27 m tall; trunk up to 48 cm in diameter. Leaves compound, 7–8 pairs of oblong or ovate-oblong leaflets. Inflorescences are axillary panicles, 10–14 cm long; flowers small, with petals up to 2.5 mm long.

Conservation
Zanthoxylum albuquerquei is considered a vulnerable species by the IUCN.

References

Trees of Peru
albuquerquei
Vulnerable plants
Taxonomy articles created by Polbot